Dillion may refer to:

 James Dillion, American Olympic discus thrower
 Dillion Everett, a character in the science fiction television series Stargate: Atlantis
 Dillion Creek, a stream in Missouri

See also
 Dillian Gordon, British art historian and curator at the National Gallery, London, from 1978 to 2010
 Dillian Whyte (born 1988), British boxer and former kickboxer and mixed martial artist
 Dillon (disambiguation)